Renzo Paparelli Coldorf (born 24 March 1997) is an Argentine professional footballer who plays as a centre-back for Talleres.

Career
Paparelli began his career with Talleres, having signed in 2013. He was moved into their senior squad in February 2019 for a Primera División fixture with Atlético Tucumán, which he subsequently started and played eighty-nine minutes of a scoreless draw at the Estadio Monumental José Fierro being before subbed off for Enzo Díaz. Four more appearances followed for him up until August 2020, when the defender left on loan to Uruguayan Segunda División side Atenas. Paparelli scored goals versus Villa Teresa on 18 September and Sud América on 30 October, having made his debut in the preceding August against Rocha. At the end of January 2022, Paparelli joined Central Norte on a one-year loan.

Career statistics
.

References

External links

1997 births
Living people
Argentine footballers
Argentine expatriate footballers
Sportspeople from Córdoba Province, Argentina
Argentine people of Italian descent
Association football defenders
Argentine Primera División players
Uruguayan Segunda División players
Talleres de Córdoba footballers
Atenas de San Carlos players
Central Norte players
Expatriate footballers in Uruguay
Argentine expatriate sportspeople in Uruguay